Galina Grigorjeva (born 2 December 1962 in Simferopol, Ukraine) is a Ukrainian composer who lives in Estonia.

She studied at Odessa Conservatory, and in 1991 she graduated from St. Petersburg Conservatory.

In the 2000s she worked at the musical group NYYD Ensemble.

In 2014 she was awarded with Order of the White Star, IV class.

Works

 Poly-phonie for piano (1998)
 Na ishod (1999)
 Con misterio (2001)
 Recitativo accompagnato (2003)
 There Is a Time for Autumn for 6 percussionists (2004)
 Hocetus (2004)
 Valge prelüüd (White Prelude: Imitating Monsieur Couperin) for baroque viola (2006)
 Aria (2007)
 Ad infinitum (2008)
 Schwarz-weiß Prelude for piano and cello (2009)
 Nox vitae for mixed choir (2010)

References

Living people
1962 births
Ukrainian composers
Women composers
Recipients of the Order of the White Star, 4th Class
Musicians from Simferopol
Estonian composers